"Epiphany" (also known as "Epiphany (I'm Leaving)") is the first single from American singer-songwriter Chrisette Michele's second studio album of the same name, released for airplay on January 27, 2009. It was an R&B top 20 hit and is her most successful single to date. It also marked her first solo entry on the Billboard Hot 100 chart, where it peaked at No. 89.

Background
"Epiphany" is about relationship experiences. Michele explained: "I heard the song that Ne-Yo had written titled 'Epiphany', and the word just stood out to me. It stood out to me because I'd been through a lot in my last relationship, and the word 'epiphany' exemplified exactly what happened in the end when I realized I didn't have to put myself through it anymore." Michele references the relationship with her former manager, Douglas "Biggs" Ellison, who Michele sued for embezzlement and harassment. Charges that were later dropped.

Critical reception
Michael Menachem of Billboard magazine said "Epiphany (I'm Leaving)' signals a more hip, funky approach for the Long Island native, melding Michele's fresh jazz tone with a trippy bassline and girl group backup vocals." The Koalition commented on how "Michele breezes through the pastoral-influenced production, crooning 'I'm leaving' to a cheating lover that she feels has deprived her living her life." Mark Edward Nero of About.com said that the mid-tempo song is Michele's declaration of independence.

Music video
The video features Michele singing in her apartment with clips of her and her boyfriend, played by Canadian rapper Drake, shown in between. During the bridge, Michele performs on top of the apartment building at daybreak, followed by scenes of her packing her boyfriend's things and throwing them out during the final chorus.

Reception
Maiya Norton of Vibe said Michele "exudes a little bit of diva as her bold new look complements her new attitude. With a chopped haircut and smoldering eyes, she kicks rapper Drake to the curb proclaiming, 'I think I'm just about over being your girlfriend. I'm leaving.' And she's downright convincing as she tosses his clothes into the dumpster. It's as though personal experience has caused a light bulb to flicker in her mind, and that wisdom echoes throughout 'Epiphany."

BET placed the video at No. 46 on its Notarized: Top 100 Videos of 2009 countdown.

Charts

Weekly charts

Year-end charts

Release history

References

External links
Chrisette Michele feat. Rick Ross & Juelz Santana – Epiphany Remix
Chrisette Michele Epiphany Music Video

2009 singles
2009 songs
Chrisette Michele songs
Music videos directed by Ray Kay
Songs written by Chuck Harmony
Song recordings produced by Chuck Harmony
Def Jam Recordings singles
Songs written by Ne-Yo
Songs about infidelity